The Texas Almanac is a biennially published reference work providing information for the general public on the history of the US state of Texas and its people, government and politics, economics, natural resources, holidays, culture, education, recreation, the arts, and other topics. Detailed information on each of the state's 254 counties is provided, along with analytical essays on a variety of topics unique to each edition; for example, topics in the 2006-2007 edition include the state's film industry and the history of Lebanese and Syrian immigration to Texas. As with many other almanacs, an extensive astronomical calendar is included. The present publisher is the Texas State Historical Association, which acquired the Texas Almanac as a gift from the A. H. Belo Corporation on May 5, 2008.

History
The Galveston News published the first edition in 1857, scarcely a decade after the Republic of Texas joined the United States. This early version was published annually through 1873, with the sole exception of the year 1866. During the Civil War years, the document consisted of a pamphlet of fewer than 70 pages, published in Houston (1862) or Austin (1863–65) due to Galveston's being blockaded by Union Army forces during that period. From 1867 through 1873, publication resumed in Galveston, although the name of the book was changed in 1869 to The Texas Almanac and Emigrant’s Guide to Texas. Following the 1875 death of the publisher, the Almanac ceased publication for almost 30 years, until George Bannerman Dealey was sent by the Galveston paper to establish a branch in Dallas and decided that resuming the Almanac would foster investment in the state's growing economy.

From 1904 through 1929, the Almanac was published more or less annually, with breaks in publication due to events such as World War I. Beginning in 1929 with the Great Depression, publication was switched to a biennial cycle; this change was not reflected in the title until the 1941-1942 edition. Special editions were created for the occasions of the 100th anniversary of the Almanac, the death of G. B. Dealey, the coinciding 110th anniversary of the Almanac and 125th anniversary of Belo Corporation, the Texas Sesquicentennial celebrating 150 years of independence from Mexico, and the sesquicentennial of the Almanac, which was the first full-color edition. In 2006, Southern Methodist University issued a limited edition reprint of the 1936 Texas Almanac, which commemorated the centennial of Texas' independence.

Electronic and supplementary works
An electronic edition, Texas Almanac Online, is published by Thomson Gale; the electronic edition is not available online to the general public, but only through subscribing institutions such as public libraries. Belo Corporation also publishes an educators' guide to the Texas Almanac.

Notes

External links

 Texas Almanac official web site
 
 Texas Almanac  hosted by the Portal to Texas History.

Almanacs
Texas culture
1857 establishments in Texas